C.D.V. agar is a nutrient medium prepared using Cicer arietinum (Bengal gram), Daucus carota (carrot) and Vigna radiata (green gram) by Vinay J. Rao and Keshava Murthy P. at Surana College, Bangalore, India under the guidance of their botany lecturers, B. R. Chandrashekarappa (H.O.D.- Dept. of Botany), Sharada H.C., and with the aid of their classmates from Vijaya College, Bangalore.

So far, CDV agar has been tried only on E. coli. Attempts will be made to try the medium on other organisms as well. The nutrient has been prepared in order to counter the discomfort of using materials such as peptone, beef extract, and yeast extract.

Abstract 
As with higher organisms, lower organisms also depend on nutrition for their survival. As a result, many microbiologists have proposed various sources of nutrition for proper microbial growth. Most nutrient media consist of animal products, the use of which is considered unethical by some. Here, an attempt has been made to substitute for animal products with some plant products.

The medium was prepared in two sets; one was autoclaved before pouring, while the other was heated to around 60 °C to conserve the proteins, which might have denatured at a higher temperature. The results obtained were very satisfactory; solitary colonies were observed in the plates with the autoclaved agar, while the heated agar gave a larger surface area of E. coli.

The above-mentioned plants were taken for this experiment due to their biochemical contents and the contents of ordinary agar. In this recipe, the chick pea replaces peptone; for a protein source, green gram replaces beef extract; for another protein source, carrot replaces yeast extract. All these plants contain proteins and carbohydrates, along with other essential biochemicals in sufficient amounts.

Presented At 
TEQIP II Sponsored National Conference, organized by Dept. Of Biotechnology, PES Institute Of Technology, Bangalore on 12th-13th Sept 2013.

Microbiological media